La Ch'tite famille is a 2018 French film directed and starring Dany Boon.

Cast
 Dany Boon : Valentin Duquenne
 Line Renaud : Mother Duquenne
 Laurence Arné : Constance Brandt
 Valérie Bonneton : Louloute
 Guy Lecluyse : Gustave
 François Berléand : Alexander
 Pierre Richard : Jacques Duquenne
 Juliane Lepoureau : Britney
 Judi Beecher : Kate Fischer
 Claudia Tagbo : Minister of Culture
 Kad Merad : Himself
 Julia Vignali : Herself
 Arthur : Himself
 Pascal Obispo : Himself
 Claire Chazal : Herself

Production
Jordan Mintzer of The Hollywood Reporter stated that the film was not specifically a sequel to Boon's previous film Bienvenue chez les Ch'tis, but was "closer to a spinoff project". Boon stated that in 2014 he wrote a second draft of a follow-up to Bienvenue chez les Ch'tis but that he "wasn’t that happy with it, something was missing." While working on Raid dingue, Boon began re-developing La Ch'tite famille.

Release
La Ch'tite famille was released in France on 28 February 2018. On its opening weekend in France, the film grossed $16,739,183 in France, debuted in first place at the French box office. The film grossed a total of $46,316,363 in France.

Reception
Mintzer of The Hollywood Reporter stated that Boon "takes his concept as far as it can go and then some, nailing a few solid laughs along the way but running out of steam after the midway mark."

References

External links
 

French comedy films
2010s French-language films
Pathé films
2018 comedy films
Films directed by Dany Boon
2010s French films